Saint-Julien-Molin-Molette is a commune in the Loire department in central France.

Population

See also
Communes of the Loire department
 Louis Bancel, French sculptor born in Saint-Julien-Molin-Molette

References

Communes of Loire (department)